Schweizer Radio und Fernsehen (SRF; "Swiss Radio and Television") is a Swiss broadcasting company created on 1 January 2011 through the merger of radio company Schweizer Radio DRS (SR DRS) and television company Schweizer Fernsehen (SF). The new business unit of SRG SSR became the largest electronic media house of German-speaking Switzerland. About 2,150 employees work for SRF in the four main studios in Basel, Bern, and Zürich.

Broadcasting

Radio

Among the radio programmes, Radio SRF Musikwelle has the longest history, as it was originally the flagship frequency on the medium wave frequency 529 kHz, broadcasting news from its central antenna near Beromünster. “Radio Beromünster” was, during World War II, together with the British BBC, one of the few independent radio programmes that could be received in large parts of Western Europe. Jean Rudolf von Salis, a Swiss historian, commented in his weekly “Weltchronik” ("world chronicle") on the development of the war and other international events.

With the introduction of VHF radio in the 1960s, the service on 529 kHz was transformed into the “Musikwelle” music service. The Geneva Frequency Plan of 1975 mandated the frequency shift to 531 kHz. In 2008, the Beromünster antenna was deactivated.

VHF, DAB and online:
Radio SRF 1 – general programming
Radio SRF 2 Kultur – cultural, intellectual programming, classical and jazz music
Radio SRF 3 – youth programming
DAB and online:
Radio SRF 4 News – news, documentaries
Radio SRF Musikwelle – pop music, chansons, folk music, Schlager
Radio SRF Virus – alternative music to Radio SRF 3
online:
Radio Swiss Jazz – non-stop Jazz programming
Radio Swiss Pop – non-stop pop music

Television
SRF 1
SRF zwei
SRF info

See also 
 Television in Switzerland

References

External links

  

Swiss Broadcasting Corporation
Mass media companies of Switzerland
Publicly funded broadcasters
Radio in Switzerland
Television networks in Switzerland
German-language television networks
German-language television in Switzerland
Television channels and stations established in 2011
2011 establishments in Switzerland